Pruden is an unincorporated community located partly in Bell County, Kentucky and partly in Claiborne County, Tennessee, in the southeastern United States. It is located along Tennessee State Route 90 and Kentucky Route 74, which intersect at the state line, in the upper Clearfork Valley.

History
Pruden had a post office on the Tennessee side of the border from September 20, 1906, to May 21, 2011; it still has its own ZIP code, 37851.

Images

References

Unincorporated communities in Bell County, Kentucky
Unincorporated communities in Claiborne County, Tennessee
Unincorporated communities in Kentucky
Unincorporated communities in Tennessee